The 16th Minesweeping Squadron was a Royal Australian Navy (RAN) minesweeping squadron. It was formed with the purchase of six Ton class minesweepers from the Royal Navy in 1962.

On 19 May 1964, the Squadron, was deployed to Singapore as part of the RAN's commitment to the Indonesia–Malaysia confrontation.

Ships of the Squadron

 HMAS Ibis 1183

References

History of the Royal Australian Navy